Lieutenant General Paul Eugene Stein (August 30, 1944 – January 10, 2002) was the thirteenth Superintendent of the United States Air Force Academy.

Education
Stein was born in 1944 in Monroe, Louisiana. He was the starting quarterback for the Air Force Falcons football team and graduated from the United States Air Force Academy with a B.S. degree in political science in 1966. Following graduation, Stein remained at the Academy to begin his career as an assistant coach for the Falcons.

In addition to the Air Force Academy's education, Stein also earned an M.A. degree in business administration from Florida State University in 1973 and graduated from the Air Command and Staff College in 1979, a national security management course in 1981, the Air War College in 1986 and the Program for Senior Executives in National and International Security at Harvard University in 1993.

Military career
Stein has served in a variety of staff positions, including deputy chief of staff for personnel, chief of staff of Tactical Air Command and commander, Keesler Technical Training Center, Keesler Air Force Base, Mississippi. Before assuming his duties as Superintendent of the Air Force Academy, he was the Air Force director of legislative liaison in Washington, D.C.

Roughly six years after his retirement, and one year after his death, General Stein's tenure as Superintendent was scrutinized in light of the Air Force Academy sexual assault scandal.  Stein's actions and leadership of the Academy were reviewed closely in the Fowler Report, the Air Force Working Group Report, and the
Report of the Defense Task Force on Sexual Harassment & Violence at the Military Service Academies.

General Stein retired from active duty on September 1, 1997.  He died on January 10, 2002, from amyotrophic lateral sclerosis.

Awards and decorations
   Air Force Distinguished Service Medal
   Legion of Merit with one oak leaf cluster.
   Meritorious Service Medal with two oak leaf clusters.
   Air Force Commendation Medal with one oak leaf cluster.
   National Defense Service Medal with service star.

References

External links
 

1944 births
2002 deaths
American football quarterbacks
Sportspeople from Monroe, Louisiana
Air Force Falcons football players
Air Force Falcons football coaches
Florida State University alumni
Air Command and Staff College alumni
Air War College alumni
Recipients of the Meritorious Service Medal (United States)
Recipients of the Legion of Merit
United States Air Force generals
Harvard University alumni
Superintendents of the United States Air Force Academy
Recipients of the Air Force Distinguished Service Medal
Recipients of the Order of the Sword (United States)
20th-century American academics